Joseph Edward Gadston (born 13 September 1945) is an English former professional footballer who played as a forward in the Football League, most notably for Exeter City. He later became a director of the club.

Club career

Gadston began his career as a youth and amateur player for West Ham United, before moving to Third Division club Brentford, for whom he failed to make a first team appearance and instead played for the reserves. He had a brief spell with Corby Town before joining Southern League club Cheltenham Town for a fee of £22 and 10 shillings. Gadston is cited as one of the greatest players to play for the Robins. Gadston moved back to the Third Division to join Bristol Rovers for a £1,500 fee in 1968 and finally made his professional debut, but he only completed one season with Rovers. His most prolific spell came with Exeter City, whom he joined in November 1969, before moving to Aldershot in July 1972. After a brief loan spell with Hartlepool in February 1973, Gadston dropped back into non-League football with Wimbledon later that year. He played out the remainder of the decade in non-League football.

Management and coaching career 
Gadston had a spell as player-manager of Ruislip Manor. He subsequently served as general manager of Swanage Town & Herston and later returned to Brentford as Football in the Community Officer.

Personal life 
Gadston worked as a coach at a sports centre in Southall between 1966 and 1968. He later became a businessman and launched a company to launch and operate Exeter City's St James Park stadium. Gadston runs a holiday apartment business in Dorset and serves the community by running a youth football club and a ping pong tournament for pensioners. He taught sport at Sunninghill Preparatory School in Dorchester until July 2014.

Career statistics

Honours 
Brentford Reserves
 London Challenge Cup: 1964–65
Individual

 Cheltenham Town Player of the Year: 1967–68

References

1945 births
Living people
English footballers
Association football forwards
Brentford F.C. players
West Ham United F.C. players
Corby Town F.C. players
Cheltenham Town F.C. players
Bristol Rovers F.C. players
Exeter City F.C. players
Aldershot F.C. players
Hartlepool United F.C. players
Wimbledon F.C. players
English Football League players
Footballers from Hanwell
Southern Football League players
Walton & Hersham F.C. players
Slough Town F.C. players
Hayes F.C. players
Tokyngton Manor F.C. players
Hanwell Town F.C. players
Isthmian League players
English football managers
Exeter City F.C. directors and chairmen
Brentford F.C. non-playing staff